LATAM Challenge Series is an open-wheel racing series based in Latin America. LATAM is the replacement for Formula Renault 2000 de America.

Venues

In the 7 seasons, 20 venues were used, all road courses. The races were mostly held in Mexico until 2013, while all the races in 2014 season were held in Florida and Texas.

In 2008 and 2009 the series was a support race for the World Touring Car Championship's Race of Mexico in Puebla.

Cars
For the first two seasons, Formula Renault 2.0 cars was used. From 2010 the series uses a Formula Vee configuration, with Volkswagen engines. Tatuus chassis are used.

Seasons

Records

Most wins

See also

 2015–16 NACAM Formula 4 Championship
 Panam GP Series

References

 
Formula racing
Auto racing series in Mexico